A-41988 (BW29Y) is an analgesic drug which acts as a cannabinoid agonist. It was developed by Abbott Laboratories in the 1970s, and researched for potential use in the treatment of glaucoma, but never commercialised.

See also 
 A-40174
 Menabitan

References 

Cannabinoids
Benzopyrans
Propargyl compounds
Phenols
Fluoroarenes